The Faculty of International Relations (FIR) is one of six faculties at the University of Economics, Prague (VŠE), located within the main university campus in Prague, Czech Republic. The faculty specializes in teaching and research in fields related to international economic and political relations.

Cooperation with Corporate Partners

FIR cooperates with various corporate partners. Each field of study has a Strategic Review and Corporate Advisory Board involving top managers 
and representatives from governmental and other institutions, often themselves FIR alumni. These corporate partners support the development of the faculty by involving experts in teaching, providing consultations for theses and seminar papers, offering internships and specialized practices, as well as with 
financial support for projects. The faculty’s partners include Globus, Komerční banka, L'Oréal, Procter & Gamble, and the Ministry of Foreign Affairs.

FIR is a member of the International Chamber of Commerce.

Research and projects
There are two journals published at the School: Working Papers, and Contemporary Europe.

The School supports a number of student projects and initiatives, of which the most significant is the Prague Student Summit, the largest Model United Nations in Central Europe. The Junior Diplomat Initiative (JDI) is among the most active student organizations, providing a platform for students to interact with Czech and foreign diplomats.

Alumni 
 Martin Jahn, businessman and former Deputy Prime Minister for the Economy of the Czech Republic
 Václav Klaus, former President of the Czech Republic, graduated from the faculty (then the Faculty of Commerce) in 1963, majoring in Foreign Trade
 Miloslav Ludvík, Czech Minister of Health (2016–17)
 Josef Tošovský, Prime Minister of the Czech Republic (1997–98), graduated from FIR in 1973
 Zdeněk Tůma, former Czech National Bank Governor

Gallery

References

External links
 Faculty of International Relations homepage

Educational institutions in Prague
Schools of international relations
Educational institutions established in 1991
1991 establishments in Czechoslovakia
Žižkov